The New Zealand Educational Institute (NZEI, in Maori: Te Riu Roa) is the largest education trade union in New Zealand. It was founded in 1883 and has a membership of 50,000.

History 

The NZEI was founded by a merger of district institutes of teachers in 1883 at a meeting in Christchurch. Under the leadership of Frank Livingstone Combs and others, it became the nationwide voice of primary school teachers. Since the 1994 merger with the Combined Early Childhood Union of Aotearoa (CECUA) it has also represented teachers in early childhood centres. Since the major New Zealand employment law changes in the 1980s and 1990s, the NZEI  negotiates the more than twenty collective agreements across the two sectors, including principals, teachers, support staff, te reo Maori immersion staff and Ministerial staff.

Early childhood education  

Due to the relatively fragmented history and nature of early childhood education in New Zealand, the largest number of collective agreements negotiated by the NZEI are in this sector.

Primary schools 

Primary staff and principals are on separate collective agreements, with separate agreements for area (rural) staff and principals, but these are negotiated together.

Strikes 

The NZEI has struck four times since it was founded in 1883.

In 1991 members struck (unsuccessfully) as part of wider industrial and union action against the Employment Contracts Act 1991, which lead to significant changes in New Zealand employment relations.

Members struck in 1994 and 1995 to successfully achieve pay parity with the Post Primary Teachers' Association (PPTA), their colleagues in secondary schooling. This related pay scales to the teachers' qualifications.

Members struck in 2018 as part of the negotiation round with the Sixth Labour Government of New Zealand. Rallies and marches were held in the major cities. In 29 May 2019, the NZEI and the PPTA stage a mega strike demanding higher salaries, rejecting the Government's three-percent pay rise offer.

On 26 June 2019, primary school teachers voted to accept the Government's NZ$1.5 billion collective agreement. Key provisions of the collective agreement include a new pay scale, raising all teachers' base salaries by 18.5% by July 2021, and making Q3+, Q4, and Q5 teachers eligible for a new top salary of NZ$90,000. However, primary principals have rejected the offer, regarding the government's offer as insufficient.

On 26 July, the New Zealand Educational Institute's early childhood teacher members voted to accept a collective agreement with the Ministry of Education that will put early childhood education teachers' pay on par with primary and secondary school teachers. As part of the terms, early childhood education teachers will receive a pay rise of at least 18.5% by July 2020, NZEI members will receive a lump sum of NZ$1,500, and there will be an increase in the head and senior teachers' allowances, and a new top step of NZ$90,000 for teachers. While the NZEI negotiates on behalf of all early childhood teachers in New Zealand, union members only make up 12.5% of the early childhood workforce in this country.

References

Further reading 
 NZEI 100, An account of the New Zealand Educational Institute, 1883 - 1983

External links 

 NZEI official site

Education International
Education trade unions
Trade unions in New Zealand
Trade unions established in 1883